World domination (also called    global domination or world conquest or cosmocracy) is a hypothetical power structure, either achieved or aspired to, in which a single political authority holds the power over all or virtually all the inhabitants of Earth. Various individuals or regimes have tried to achieve this goal throughout history, without ever attaining it.
The theme has been often used in works of fiction, particularly in political fiction, as well as in conspiracy theories (which may posit that some person or group has already secretly achieved this goal), particularly those fearing the development of a "New World Order" involving a world government of a totalitarian nature.

History

While various empires over the course of history have been able to expand and dominate large parts of the world, none have come close to conquering all the territory on Earth. However, these empires have had a global impact in cultural and economic terms that is still felt today. Some of the largest and more prominent empires include:
 The Mongol Empire, which in the 13th century under Genghis Khan came to control the largest continuous land empire in the world, spanning from East Asia to the Middle East and Eastern Europe. It eventually fractured and ended with the fall of the Yuan dynasty, which was established by Kublai Khan. It reached its greatest extent in 1309, when it controlled the region through which the Silk Road trade route ran. Ensuring the stability of this trade route enabled commerce across Eurasia, accelerating the pace of economic and technological development around the world.
 The British Empire, originating under Elizabeth I, was the largest empire in history. By 1921, the British Empire reached its height and dominated a quarter of the globe, controlling territory on each continent. The empire went through a long period of decline and decolonization following the end of the Second World War, until it ceased to be a dominant force in world affairs. English is still the official language in many countries, most of which were former British colonies, and is widely spoken as a second language around the world. The Industrial Revolution that took place in the United Kingdom from the 18th century was spread to the rest of the globe through the expansion of the British Empire, enabling the development of an industrialized global economy.
 The Russian Empire, which controlled vast areas of Eurasia stretching from the Baltic region to outer Manchuria, reaching its largest extent in 1895. The empire collapsed during the February Revolution in 1917, which saw Tsar Nicholas II abdicate. The cultural and economic unity of the Russian Empire allowed the rise of its successor state, the Soviet Union, a superpower whose military strength and ideology were major forces in global politics during the 20th century.  After the collapse of the Soviet Union in 1991, the Russian Federation remains one of the few nations to pursue its goals through territorial conquest in the 21st century. 
By the early 21st century, wars of territorial conquest were uncommon and the world's nations could attempt to resolve their differences through multilateral diplomacy under the auspices of global organizations like the United Nations and World Trade Organization. The world's superpowers and potential superpowers rarely attempt to exert global influence through the types of territorial empire-building seen in history, but the influence of historical empires is still important and the idea of world domination is still socially and culturally relevant.

Social and political ideologies

Historically, world domination has been thought of in terms of a nation expanding its power to the point that all other nations are subservient to it. This may be achieved by establishing a hegemony, an indirect form of government and of imperial dominance in which the hegemon (leader state) rules geopolitically subordinate states by means of its implied power—by the threat of force, rather than by direct military force. However, domination can also be achieved by direct military force. In the 4th century BCE, Alexander the Great notably expressed a desire to conquer the world, and a legend persists that after he completed his military conquest of the known ancient world, he "wept because he had no more worlds to conquer", as he was unaware of China farther to the east and had no way to know about civilizations in the Americas. However, with the full size and scope of the world known, it has been said that "world domination is an impossible goal", and specifically that "no single nation however big and powerful can dominate a world" of well over a hundred interdependent nations and billions of people.

An opposite view was expressed by Hans Morgenthau in 1948. He stressed that the mechanical development of weapons, transportation, and communication makes "the conquest of the world technically possible, and they make it technically possible to keep the world in that conquered state." He argues that a lack of such infrastructure explains why great ancient empires, though vast, failed to complete the universal conquest of their world and perpetuate the conquest. "Today no technological obstacle stands in the way of a world-wide empire," as "modern technology makes it possible to extend the control of mind and action to every corner of the globe regardless of geography and season." Morgenthau continued on the technological progress:

In the early 17th century, Sir Walter Raleigh proposed that world domination could be achieved through control of the oceans, writing that "whosoever commands the sea commands the trade; whosoever commands the trade of the world commands the riches of the world, and consequently the world itself". In 1919, Halford Mackinder offered another influential theory for a route to world domination, writing:

While Mackinder's "Heartland Theory" initially received little attention outside geography, it later exercised some influence on the foreign policies of world powers seeking to obtain the control suggested by the theory. Impressed with the swift opening of World War II, Derwent Whittlesey wrote in 1942:

Yet before the entrance of the United States into this War and with Isolationism still intact, U.S. strategist Hanson W. Baldwin had projected that "[t]omorrow air bases may be the highroad to power and domination... Obviously it is only by air bases ... that power exercised in the sovereign skies above a nation can be stretched far beyond its shores... Perhaps... future acquisitions of air bases ... can carry the voice of America through the skies to the ends of the earth.

Some proponents of ideologies (anarchism, communism, fascism, Nazism, and capitalism) actively pursue the goal of establishing a form of government consistent with their political beliefs, or assert that the world is moving "naturally" towards the adoption of a particular form of government (or self), authoritarian or anti-authoritarian. These proposals are not concerned with a particular nation achieving world domination, but with all nations conforming to a particular social or economic model. A goal of world domination can be to establish a world government, a single common political authority for all of humanity. The period of the Cold War, in particular, is considered to be a period of intense ideological polarization, given the existence of two rival blocs—the capitalist West and the communist East—that each expressed the hope of seeing the triumph of their ideology over that of the enemy. The ultimate end of such a triumph would be that one ideology or the other would become the sole governing ideology in the world.

In certain religions, some adherents may also seek the conversion (peaceful or forced) of as many people as possible to their own religion, without restrictions of national or ethnic origin. This type of spiritual domination is usually seen as distinct from the temporal dominion, although there have been instances of efforts begun as holy wars devolving into the pursuit of wealth, resources, and territory. Some Christian groups teach that a false religion, led by false prophets who achieve world domination by inducing nearly universal worship of a false deity, is a prerequisite to end times described in the Book of Revelation. As one author put it, "[i]f world domination is to be obtained, the masses of little people must be brought on board with religion".

In some instances, speakers have accused nations or ideological groups of seeking world domination, even where those entities have denied that this was their goal. For example, J. G. Ballard quoted Aldous Huxley as having said of the United States entering the First World War, "I dread the inevitable acceleration of American world domination which will be the result of it all...Europe will no longer be Europe". In 2012, politician and critic of Islam Geert Wilders characterized Islam as "an ideology aiming for world domination rather than a religion", and in 2008 characterized the 2008 Israel–Gaza conflict as a proxy action by Islam against the West, contending that "[t]he end of Israel would not mean the end of our problems with Islam, but only... the start of the final battle for world domination".

See also

World revolution
Americanization
American imperialism
Russian imperialism
Chinese expansionism
Global governance, the political interaction of transnational actors.
Hyperpower, a state that dominates all other states in every sphere of activity, and is traditionally considered to be a step higher than a superpower.
List of largest empires by maximum extent of land area occupied.
Mad scientist, a fictional archetype of a scientist, engineer, or professor who is considered "mad" and often depicted as having a desire to "take over the world".
Pinky and the Brain, a television show in which two lab mice attempt to "take over the world."
Singleton (global governance), a hypothetical world order in which there is a single decision-making agency (potentially an advanced artificial intelligence) at the highest level, capable of exerting effective control over its domain.
Superpower, a state with a leading position in the international system and the ability to influence events in its own interest by global projection of power.
Technocracy, a form of organizational structure or system of governance where decision makers are selected on the basis of technological knowledge.
Whig history, a school of historiography which claims that the world is moving towards increased liberty and enlightenment.
King of the Universe
Universal monarchy

References

External links

Politics
Domination